Giulio De Florian (Ziano di Fiemme 13 January 1936 – Ziano di Fiemme 17 February 2010) was an Italian cross-country skier who competed during the 1960s. He won two bronze medals at the FIS Nordic World Ski Championships, earning one in 1962 (30 km) and the other in 1966 (4 x 10 km).

De Florian also finished fifth in the 30 km event at the 1968 Winter Olympics in Grenoble.

Further notable results:
 1959: 1st, Italian men's championships of cross-country skiing, 15 km
 1960: 1st, Italian men's championships of cross-country skiing, 30 km
 1961: 
 1st, Italian men's championships of cross-country skiing, 50 km
 1st, Italian men's championships of cross-country skiing, 30 km
 2nd, Italian men's championships of cross-country skiing, 15 km
 1962:
 1st, Italian men's championships of cross-country skiing, 30 km
 2nd, Italian men's championships of cross-country skiing, 50 km
 1964: 2nd, Italian men's championships of cross-country skiing, 15 km
 1965:
 1st, Italian men's championships of cross-country skiing, 50 km
 2nd, Italian men's championships of cross-country skiing, 30 km
 3rd, Italian men's championships of cross-country skiing, 15 km
 1966: 2nd, Italian men's championships of cross-country skiing, 15 km
 1967:
 1st, Italian men's championships of cross-country skiing, 15 km
 3rd, Italian men's championships of cross-country skiing, 50 km
 3rd, Italian men's championships of cross-country skiing, 30 km

References

1936 births
2010 deaths
Italian male cross-country skiers
Cross-country skiers at the 1960 Winter Olympics
Cross-country skiers at the 1964 Winter Olympics
Cross-country skiers at the 1968 Winter Olympics
Olympic cross-country skiers of Italy
FIS Nordic World Ski Championships medalists in cross-country skiing
Sportspeople from Trentino